Kunstschutz (art protection)  is the German term for the principle of preserving cultural heritage and artworks during armed conflict, especially during the First World War and Second World War, with the stated aim of protecting the enemy's art and returning after the end of hostilities. It is associated with the image of the "art officer" (Kunstoffizier) or "art expert" (Kunstsachverständiger).

The Allies instituted a Monuments, Fine Arts, and Archives program tasked with identifying, locating, securing, storing, and returning stolen art after the war.

Kunstschutz archive project
The German military protection of art in France (and in Europe) in the Second World War acted in the occupied countries against the institutions and people who carried out art theft, in particular against Hermann Göring and the task force Reichsleiter Rosenberg. In view of the disparate transmission situation of the sources that are scattered in German, French, English and American archives, an academic study of art protection has largely remained a desideratum for research to this day. The creation of a subject-related inventory on art protection and art looting in the Second World War, which virtually brings together the sources on the subject handed down in various archives worldwide, is therefore not only of particular value for provenance research.

The reason for the project was the transfer of the estate of Franziskus Graf Wolff Metternich (1893-1978) to the Vereinigte Adelsarchive im Rheinland e. V. (VAR). Their office is located in the LVR Archive Advice and Training Center (LVR-AFZ), which also takes on the project management. The Bonn art historian Wolf Metternich held the office of provincial curator for the Rhine province from 1928 to 1950 and was appointed head of military art protection in France at the Army High Command in May 1940. In addition to personal documents, his estate includes what is probably the most complete surviving record of art protection during World War II.

The estate was in the family for decades and was not accessible to the public. Only the interest of the Russian director Alexander Sokurov in the subject of art theft and the person of Wolff Metternich prompted the family to deposit the estate with the VAR. After its development, which was carried out by the LVR-AFZ in the years 2013 to 2016, the estate is now available for research without restrictions. Sokurov's film "Frankofonia" had its cinema premiere at the end of January 2016 in the presence of the Wolff Metternich family.

From September 1, 2016, the Federal Foundation German Center for the Loss of Cultural Assets in Magdeburg financed two project positions for the creation of a subject-related inventory. Within three years, a factual inventory was created on the essential tradition of art protection in the Second World War, which compiles the archival sources in German, French, Belgian, American and English archives that complement the central legacy of Wolff Metternich and thus offers an essential tool for international provenance research. With the documents from the estate of Franziskus Graf Wolff Metternich and their comparison with counterparts in other international archives, the structures and networks of art protection in the Second World War are made visible for the first time.

The archival material inventory is presented here in the form of an online database and is accompanied by a print publication for scientific classification. After the end of the project, the results were presented in September 2019 at an international scientific conference in the LVR cultural center in Brauweiler Abbey.

History

World War I

The Germans' lack of respect for the international Hague Conventions on land warfare created in 1899 and 1907, which had included the protection of cultural property, led to international shock at the burning of Leuven University Library in Belgium and the bombardment of Reims Cathedral in France, both in 1914 (the Louvain library would be re-formed and rebuilt in the 1920s but destroyed again in the 1940 Battle of France).

To counter the protests, counterbalance the destruction, redeem itself in the eyes of international agencies and regain its image as the land of culture par excellence, German propaganda created the principle of Kunstschutz. The principle allowed Germany to experiment with new formulas for saving and developing cultural heritage and originated many, often fertile initiatives. Clemen, professor of art history at the University of Bonn and inspector of monuments in the Rhineland, was one of the principle's first instigators. A German soldier 'saved' cultural objects in Saint-Quentin, Aisne, though these were only returned in 1998, and a painting similarly removed from Douai museum was returned only in 2000 after it was discovered at a sale in Switzerland. The museum at Metz has put on an exhibition on the activities of its former German curator, the archaeologist Johann Baptist Keune, in protecting the artistic heritage of the Moselle during the conflict.

Inter-war period

After assuming power in 1933, Hitler and other nazis started anti-semitic policies designed to degrade and humiliate German Jews. Their aim was ultimately to exile or murder their victims, and steal their worldly possessions, including any artwork such as paintings, drawings and prints, as well as furniture, antiques, books, tapestries, carpets and so on. Adolf Hitler was an unsuccessful artist who was denied admission to the Vienna Academy of Fine Arts. Nonetheless, he thought of himself as a connoisseur of the arts, and in Mein Kampf he ferociously attacked modern art as degenerate, including: Cubism; Futurism; and Dadaism; all of which he considered the product of a decadent twentieth century society. When in 1933 Hitler became Chancellor of Germany, he enforced his aesthetic ideal on the nation. The types of art that were favoured amongst the Nazi party were classical portraits and landscapes by Old Masters, particularly those of Germanic origin. Modern art that did not match this was dubbed degenerate art by the Third Reich, and all that was found in Germany's state museums was to be sold or destroyed. With the sums raised, the Fuhrer's objective was to establish the European Art Museum in Linz. Other Nazi dignitaries, like Reichsmarschall Hermann Göring and Foreign Affairs minister von Ribbentrop, were also intent on taking advantage of German military conquests to increase their private art collections.

The art dealers Hildebrand Gurlitt, Karl Buchholz, Ferdinand Moeller and Bernhard Boehmer set up shop in Schloss Niederschonhausen, just outside Berlin, to sell the near-16,000 cache of paintings and sculptures which Hitler and Göring removed from the walls of German museums in 1937–38. They were first put on display in the Haus der Kunst in Munich on 19 July 1937, with the Nazi leaders inviting public mockery by two million visitors. Propagandist Joseph Goebbels in a radio broadcast called Germany's degenerate artists "garbage". Hitler opened the Haus der Kunst exhibition with a speech, at the end of which saliva fell out of his mouth in rage. In it he described German art as suffering "a great and fatal illness".

Burning of artwork

Hildebrand Gurlitt and his colleagues did not have much success with their sales, mainly because art labelled "rubbish" had small appeal. So on 20 March 1939 they set fire to 1,004 paintings and sculptures and 3,825 watercolours, drawings and prints in the courtyard of the Berlin Fire Department, an act of infamy similar to their earlier well-known book burnings. The propaganda act raised the attention they hoped. The Basel Museum in Switzerland arrived with 50,000 Swiss francs to spend.  Shocked art lovers came to buy. What is unknown after these sales is how many paintings were kept by Gurlitt, Buchholz, Moeller and Boehmer and sold by them to Switzerland and America – ships crossed the Atlantic from Lisbon – for personal gain.

While the Nazis were in power, they plundered cultural property from every territory they occupied. This was conducted in a systematic manner with organizations specifically created to determine which public and private collections were most valuable to the Nazi Regime. Some of the objects were earmarked for Hitler's never realized Führermuseum, some objects went to other high-ranking officials such as Hermann Göring, while other objects were traded to fund Nazi activities.

World War II

In 1940, an organization known as the Einsatzstab Reichsleiter Rosenberg für die Besetzten Gebiete (The Reichsleiter Rosenberg Institute for the Occupied Territories), or ERR, was formed, headed for Alfred Rosenberg by Gerhard Utikal. The first operating unit, the western branch for France, Belgium and the Netherlands, called the Dienststelle Westen (Western Agency), was located in Paris. The chief of this Dienststelle was Kurt von Behr. Its original purpose was to collect Jewish and Freemasonic books and documents, either for destruction, or for removal to Germany for further "study". However, late in 1940, Hermann Göring, who in fact controlled the ERR, issued an order that effectively changed the mission of the ERR, mandating it to seize "Jewish" art collections and other objects. The war loot had to be collected in a central place in Paris, the Musée jeu de paume.

At the collection point, art historians and other personnel worked and inventoried the loot before sending it to Germany. Göring also commanded that the loot would first be divided between Hitler and himself. From late 1940 to late 1942, he went to Paris 20 times. In the Musée jeu de paume, art dealer Bruno Lohse staged 20 expositions of the newly looted art objects, especially for Göring, from which Göring selected at least 594 pieces for his own collection. Göring made Lohse his liaison-officer and installed him in the ERR in March 1941 as the deputy leader of this unit. Items which Hitler and Göring did not want were made available to other Nazi leaders. Under Rosenberg and Göring's leadership, the ERR seized 21,903 art objects from German-occupied countries.

Other Nazi looting organizations included the Dienststelle Mühlmann, operated by Kajetan Mühlmann, which Göring also controlled and operated primarily in the Netherlands, Belgium, and a Sonderkommando Kuensberg connected to the minister of foreign affairs Joachim von Ribbentrop, which operated first in France, then in Russia and North Africa.

Hitler later ordered that all confiscated works of art were to be made directly available to him. Art collections from prominent Jewish families, including the Rothschilds, the Rosenbergs and the Goudstikkers and the Schloss Family were targeted because of their significant value. By the end of the war, the Third Reich amassed hundreds of thousands of cultural objects.

In Western Europe, with the advancing German troops, were elements of the von Ribbentrop Battalion, named after Joachim von Ribbentrop. The men were responsible for entering private and institutional libraries in the occupied countries and removing any materials of interest to the Germans, especially items of scientific, technical or other informational value.

Kunstschutz activities

Kunstschutz's altruistic image in World War I aided its reinstatement in World War II. On the initiative of Marshal Hermann Göring, a specialist military corps known as the Kunstschutz was reactivated following the Armistice between Italy and Allied armed forces of September 1943 to requisition Italian artworks and transport them to Germany, under the pretext of saving them from Allied bombing. In Florence 58 crates of marble and bronze statues (by Donatello and Michelangelo among others), 26 ancient Greek statues, 291 large paintings (including works by Titian, Botticelli and Raphael) and 25 crates of smaller paintings set out for Germany and Austria in convoys which many Italian intelligence officers secretly followed and reported back on to their government and thus to the Allies. One of those officers was the antifascist Rodolfo Siviero, who transmitted his reports to the Allies via his partisan contacts and continued to hunt down and return looted and illegally acquired Italian artworks from Germany after 1945. One of those he returned was the  Spiridon Leda (1505–1515) from the Leonardo da Vinci school, acquired by Göring before the war. In Naples the national museums were looted, with paintings taken including the Danaë by Titian, The Blind Leading the Blind by Pieter Bruegel the Elder, the Portrait of a young woman, known as Antea by Parmigianino and the Apollo Citharoedus from Pompeii.

Goebels had also edited a 1000-page inventory of French artworks in the occupied zone of France. Count Franz von Wolff-Metternich was responsible for the Kunstschutz in France from 1940 to 1942 and most works in French museums were taken Collections belonging to Jews such as the Rothschilds and the David-Weill family were evacuated using the funds of the French national museums and gathered together in the Musée du Jeu de Paume, where Göring took his pick before putting them all in special trains bound for Berlin. Rose Valland, one of the French curators, took secret notes on the contents of each train out. Ribbentrop, the German foreign minister, tried to get hold of Diana Bathing by François Boucher, whilst Hitler himself took part of Alfred Schloss's collection of 300 Dutch paintings for his personal museum at Linz.

German art looting also occurred in every state invaded and occupied by Germany, but especially Poland, Czechoslovakia, the Soviet Union, the Netherlands, Belgium, Luxembourg and elsewhere.

See also
Nazi gold
Nazi loot
Degenerate art
Gurlitt Collection
Reichsleiter Rosenberg Taskforce

References

Bibliography
 War Land in the Eastern Front. Culture, National Identity, and German Occupation in World War I, Cambridge, Cambridge University Press, 2000.
 Marvin C. Ross, "The Kunstschutz in Occupied France", College Art Journal, Vol. 5, No. 4 (May, 1946), pp. 336–352
  Maria Starvrinaki, Rapports entre Révolution sociale et révolutions artistiques chez les architectes et peintres allemands sous la République de Weimar.
  Correspondence collective de la Gläserne Kette, groupe de treize artistes et architectes (Taut, Scharoun, les Luckhardt, Walter Gropius, ...), démontrant la réaction communautariste au lendemain de la Grande Guerre. 
  Ernst Kubin,  Raub oder Schutz? Der deutsche militärische Kunstschutz in Italien, Stocker 2001, 
  Thèse et livre de Christina Kott en 2002 (en cotutelle avec la FU Berlin) : Protéger, confisquer, déplacer : le service allemand de préservation des œuvres d’art (Kunstschutz) en Belgique et en France occupées pendant la Première Guerre mondiale 1914–1924. , Peter Lang 2006 
  Antoine Fleury,  Le rôle des guerres dans la mémoire des Européens : leur effet sur la conscience d’être européen, Berne, Peter Lang, 1997.
  Paul Clemen, Kunstschutz im Kriege (Die Kriegsschauplätze in Italien, im Osten und Südosten).
  Vejas Gabriel Liulevicius, Kriegsland im Osten. Eroberung, Kolonisierung und Militärherrschaft im Ersten Weltkrieg, Hamburg, Hamburg Édition, 2002.

External links
  Antoine Fleury : Le Kunstschutz entre mémoire et histoire 
  Axe 1 du CRIA
  Savoirs, identités, normes : production, appropriation et recomposition de modèles culturels
  Article on the work of Christina Kott

Art crime
Nazi culture
Cultural history of World War I
Cultural history of World War II
Art and cultural repatriation